The USAFL Western Regionals is a representative Australian rules football tournament of USAFL clubs based in the western regions of the United States.

It is a two-part series established after the collapse of the Californian Australian Football League in 2004 to give clubs without regular league play (although some participate in the North West Pacific Australian Football League) a chance to compete in preparation for the USAFL National Championships, determining the seedings for the nationals as well as the USAFL East vs West tournament.

Sides that compete or have competed include:
Arizona Hawks
Denver Bulldogs
Golden Gate Roos
Mojave Greens
Orange County Giants
San Diego Lions
Seattle Grizzlies

History
The first Western Regionals were held in San Diego on August 14 and 15 of 2004, with the Denver Bulldogs winning the tournament.

The 2005 series round 1 was held in Orange County and round 2 in Denver, again dominated by the Denver Bulldogs.

The 2006 round 1 series was held in San Pedro, with San Diego Lions taking the honours.  The second round was hosted at San Diego with the San Diego Lions also taking out the honours.

The 2007 Western Regionals are scheduled for Denver July 14 and 15. The tournament is being played at the US Air Force Academy just north of Colorado Springs.

See also

References

External links

Australian rules football competitions in the United States